Interstate 235 (I-235) in Kansas is a  north–south bypass spur route of I-35 that travels through the western part of Wichita. Its northern terminus is at an interchange with I-135/U.S. Highway 81 (US-81)/K-15/K-96/K-254 north of the city, where the freeway continues east as K-254. The southern is at I-135/US-81 shortly before US-81 separates from I-135 and I-135 connects to I-35 (here known as the Kansas Turnpike) at I-135's own southern terminus.

History
Aside from the Kansas Turnpike, I-235 is the first component of the Interstate Highway System to be built in Wichita. The vast majority of its length, running from its original southern terminus at the Kansas Turnpike to the Broadway Avenue interchange in north Wichita, was built in 1960–1961 and was open to traffic by 1962. The remaining unbuilt length, connecting Broadway Avenue to the northern terminus, was open to traffic by July 1965. The short length of I-235 between the Turnpike interchange and the present I-135/I-235 split later became part of I-135.

Exit list

References

External links

 Kansas Highway Maps: Current, Historic, KDOT
 AAroads I-235 page
 North I-235 Overhaul Project, 2019 to 2021, KDOT

35-2
35-2 Kansas
2 Kansas
Transportation in Wichita, Kansas
Transportation in Sedgwick County, Kansas